Axoclinus multicinctus, known commonly as the multibarred triplefin, is a species of triplefin blenny. This species is endemic to the eastern Pacificwhere it is known to occur only from the Revillagigedo Islands of Socorro and San Benedicto.

References

multicinctus
Fish described in 1992